The following television stations operate on virtual channel 9 in the United States:

 K02AO-D in Eureka, Montana
 K02EE-D in Weaverville, California
 K02IK-D in Gateview, Colorado
 K03HX-D in Etna, California
 K04IH-D in Baker, Montana
 K04OS-D in Reedsport, Oregon
 K04RP-D in Delta Junction, Alaska
 K05CR-D in Hayfork, California
 K05FC-D in Lake McDonald, Montana
 K07JS-D in North Bend, Oregon
 K08OB-D in Newell, California
 K08OV-D in Nenana, Alaska
 K09NH-D in Shungnak, Alaska
 K09NI-D in Mekoryuk, Alaska
 K09NK-D in Perryville, Alaska
 K09NO-D in Pilot Point, Alaska
 K09OT-D in Valdez, Alaska
 K09OV-D in Kotzebue, Alaska
 K09OW-D in Nome, Alaska
 K09PC-D in Grayling, Alaska
 K09PO-D in Chevak, Alaska
 K09QC-D in McGrath, Alaska
 K09QG-D in Chalkyitsik, Alaska
 K09QK-D in Karluk, Alaska
 K09QM-D in Nelson Lagoon, Alaska
 K09QP-D in Kake, Alaska
 K09QR-D in Gambell, Alaska
 K09QU-D in Togiak, Alaska
 K09QW-D in King Cove, Alaska
 K09QX-D in St. Michael, Alaska
 K09RA-D in Sand Point, Alaska
 K09RB-D in St. Paul, Alaska
 K09RC-D in Unalakleet, Alaska
 K09RE-D in St. George, Alaska
 K09RF-D in Eagle Village, Alaska
 K09RP-D in False Pass, Alaska
 K09SA-D in Koyuk, Alaska
 K09SG-D in Goodnews Bay, Alaska
 K09SL-D in Kotlik, Alaska
 K09SP-D in Igiugig, Alaska
 K09SR-D in Port Lions, Alaska
 K09TK-D in Elfin Cove, Alaska
 K09TR-D in Kalskag, Alaska
 K09TT-D in Circle, Alaska
 K09TW-D in Venetie, Alaska
 K09TX-D in Kaltag, Alaska
 K09YK-D in Durango/Purgatory, Colorado
 K09YW-D in Leamington, Utah
 K09ZN-D in Blanding/Monticello, Utah
 K09ZO-D in Juab, Utah
 K09ZT-D in Beaver, Utah
 K09AAF-D in Monterey, California
 K10RF-D in Long Valley Junction, Utah
 K10RN-D in Helper, Utah
 K11BX-D in Sutherlin, Oregon
 K11GT-D in Eugene, Oregon
 K11KI-D in Dorena, etc., Oregon
 K11XC-D in Salina & Redmond, Utah
 K11XE-D in Marysvale, Utah
 K11XL-D in Roosevelt, etc., Utah
 K13AAE-D in Healy, Alaska
 K14HX-D in Lakehead, California
 K14NM-D in Anton & SW Wash County, Colorado
 K14OA-D in Preston, Idaho
 K15IA-D in Orderville, Utah
 K15IF-D in Basalt, Colorado
 K15JG-D in Scottsburg, Oregon
 K15LI-D in Sterling, Colorado
 K15LP-D in Rural Carbon County, Utah
 K16BO-D in Milford, etc., Utah
 K16IB-D in Mount Pleasant, Utah
 K16NS-D in Redstone, Colorado
 K17JK-D in Cane Beds, Arizona/Hildale, Utah
 K17KB-D in Belgrade, etc., Montana
 K17MV-D in Richfield, etc., Utah
 K17OB-D in Plevna, Montana
 K18CR-D in Circle, etc., Montana
 K18GM-D in Pleasant Valley, Colorado
 K18KD-D in Libby, Montana
 K18KH-D in Julesburg, Colorado
 K18MB-D in International Falls, Minnesota
 K18MF-D in Torrey, etc., Utah
 K18MG-D in Panguitch, Utah
 K18ML-D in Henrieville, Utah
 K18MM-D in Rural Sevier County, Utah
 K18MN-D in Koosharem, Utah
 K18MT-D in Cedar City, Utah
 K18ND-D in Chico and Paradise, California
 K18NG-D in McDermitt, Nevada
 K19FH-D in Aspen, Colorado
 K19GL-D in Yreka, California
 K19ID-D in Green River, Utah
 K19LG-D in Rural Garfield County, Utah
 K19LJ-D in Frost, Minnesota
 K19LN-D in Mayfield, Utah
 K19LV-D in St. George, Utah
 K19LW-D in Sterling, Colorado
 K19MD-D in Orangeville, Utah
 K20DE-D in Alturas/Likely, California
 K20IJ-D in Wauneta, Nebraska
 K20NN-D in Scipio, Utah
 K21JN-D in Erick, Oklahoma
 K21MT-D in Seiling, Oklahoma
 K21NH-D in Laketown, etc., Utah
 K21NI-D in Wendover, Utah
 K21OI-D in McCook/Culbertson, Nebraska
 K22CQ-D in Idalia, Colorado
 K22DM-D in Rural Summit County, Utah
 K22LD-D in Chinook, Montana
 K22MB-D in Roseburg, Oregon
 K22MU-D in Circleville, Utah
 K23DJ-D in Ekalaka, Montana
 K23FO-D in Jackson, Minnesota
 K23FT-D in Myton, Utah
 K23JX-D in Hatch, Utah
 K23ME-D in Camas Valley, Oregon
 K23MF-D in St. James, Minnesota
 K24ID-D in Fernadle, Montana
 K24IP-D in Huntington, Utah
 K24MP-D in Butte, Montana
 K24MS-D in Roseau, Minnesota
 K24NZ-D in Carbondale, Colorado
 K25GZ-D in Holyoke, Colorado
 K25LH-D in Fishlake Resort, Utah
 K25MW-D in Baudette, Minnesota
 K25NI-D in Mapleton, Oregon
 K25PL-D in Ridgecrest, California
 K26MW-D in Lucerne Valley, California
 K26NZ-D in Kanarraville/New Harmony, Utah
 K27CD-D in Boulder, Montana
 K27CL-D in Coos Bay/North Bend, Oregon
 K27FI-D in Frost, Minnesota
 K27HR-D in Manti & Ephraim, Utah
 K27LO-D in Emigrant, Montana
 K27MY-D in Altus, Oklahoma
 K27NG-D in Fountain Green, Utah
 K27NK-D in Parowan, Enoch, etc., Utah
 K27NM-D in Delta, etc., Utah
 K27OP-D in Oro Valley/Tucson, Arizona
 K28CY-D in Lewiston, California
 K28DB-D in Fall River Mills, California
 K28KN-D in Emery, Utah
 K28OP-D in Boulder, Utah
 K28OR-D in Caineville, Utah
 K29ID-D in Weeksville, Montana
 K29IV-D in Fremont, Utah
 K29KE-D in Big Falls, Minnesota
 K30PD-D in Kanab, Utah
 K30PF-D in Fillmore etc., Utah
 K30PJ-D in Beryl/New Castle/Modena, Utah
 K30PM-D in Price, Utah
 K31EL-D in Tropic, etc., Utah
 K31KP-D in Alton, Utah
 K31PI-D in London Springs, Oregon
 K32EX-D in Peetz, Colorado
 K32MH-D in Washington, etc., Utah
 K32MK-D in Park City, Utah
 K32MU-D in Hanksville, Utah
 K32MV-D in Antimony, Utah
 K32NG-D in Green River, Utah
 K32NH-D in Ferron, Utah
 K32OK-D in Woody Creek, Colorado
 K32OX-D in Lucerne Valley, California
 K33DO-D in Vernal, Utah
 K33FO-D in Benkelman, Nebraska
 K33KH-D in Nephi, Utah
 K33PD-D in Toquerville, Hurricane, Utah
 K33PS-D in Randolph, Utah
 K34DP-D in Plevna, Montana
 K34FV-D in Duchesne, Utah
 K34JJ-D in Hollis, Oklahoma
 K34KL-D in Powers, Oregon
 K34NU-D in Jackson, Minnesota
 K34NY-D in Escalante, Utah
 K34PF-D in Scofield, Utah
 K34PW-D in Haxtun, Colorado
 K35HW-D in Florence, Oregon
 K35KL-D in Manila, etc., Utah
 K35MY-D in Birchdale, Minnesota
 K35ND-D in Rural Garfield, etc., Utah
 K36JT-D in Clear Creek, Utah
 K36JV-D in East Price, Utah
 K36NQ-D in Altus, Oklahoma
 K36NX-D in Pringle, South Dakota
 K36OA-D in Red Lake, Minnesota
 K36OR-D in Logan, Utah
 K42HK-D in Cottage Grove, Oregon
 K50DB-D in Alexandria, Minnesota
 K50HZ-D in Willmar, Minnesota
 KAWE in Bemidji, Minnesota
 KBHE-TV in Rapid City, South Dakota
 KCAL-TV in Los Angeles, California
 KCAU-TV in Sioux City, Iowa
 KCFW-TV in Kalispell, Montana
 KCRG-TV in Cedar Rapids, Iowa
 KCTS-TV in Seattle, Washington
 KDSE in Dickinson, North Dakota
 KECY-TV in El Centro, California
 KEFM-LD in Sacramento, California
 KETC in St. Louis, Missouri
 KETG in Arkadelphia, Arkansas
 KEZI in Eugene, Oregon
 KGMD-TV in Hilo, Hawaii
 KGUN-TV in Tucson, Arizona
 KHII-TV in Honolulu, Hawaii
 KIXE-TV in Redding, California
 KLRN in San Antonio, Texas
 KMBC-TV in Kansas City, Missouri
 KMSP-TV in Minneapolis, Minnesota
 KNIN-TV in Caldwell, Idaho
 KNMD-TV in Santa Fe, New Mexico
 KOOD in Hays, Kansas
 KPNE-TV in North Platte, Nebraska
 KQED in San Francisco, California
 KRBC-TV in Abilene, Texas
 KSDX-LD in San Diego, California
 KTRE in Lufkin, Texas
 KTSM-TV in El Paso, Texas
 KUAC-TV in Fairbanks, Alaska
 KUEN in Ogden, Utah
 KUSA in Denver, Colorado
 KUSM-TV in Bozeman, Montana
 KWES-TV in Odessa, Texas
 KWTV-DT in Oklahoma City, Oklahoma
 KXLH-LD in Helena, Montana
 W27EI-D in Moorefield, West Virginia
 W28DR-D in Cedarville, West Virginia
 W29DP-D in Welch, West Virginia
 W32EG-D in Williams, Minnesota
 WAFB in Baton Rouge, Louisiana
 WAOW in Wausau, Wisconsin
 WBON-LD in Richmond, Kentucky
 WCPO-TV in Cincinnati, Ohio
 WCTA-LD in Columbus, Georgia
 WFTC in Minneapolis, Minnesota
 WFTV in Orlando, Florida
 WGN-TV in Chicago, Illinois
 WHDT in Stuart, Florida
 WJKF-CD in Jacksonville, Florida
 WMUR-TV in Manchester, New Hampshire
 WNBW-DT in Gainesville, Florida
 WNCT-TV in Greenville, North Carolina
 WNGF-LD in Gouverneur, New York
 WNIN in Evansville, Indiana
 WNSH-LD in Nashville, Tennessee
 WQWQ-LD in Paducah, Kentucky
 WSOC-TV in Charlotte, North Carolina
 WSUR-DT in Ponce, Puerto Rico
 WSWP-TV in Grandview, West Virginia
 WSYR-TV in Syracuse, New York
 WTOV-TV in Steubenville, Ohio
 WTVA in Tupelo, Mississippi
 WTVC in Chattanooga, Tennessee
 WTVM in Columbus, Georgia
 WUSA in Washington, D.C.
 WVAN-TV in Savannah, Georgia
 WWOR-TV in Secaucus, New Jersey
 WWTV in Cadillac, Michigan
 WXON-LD in Flint, Michigan

The following stations, which are no longer licensed, formerly operated on virtual channel 9:
 K07IA-D in Oakland, Oregon
 K08OR-D in Canby, California
 K09BJ-D in Entiat, Washington
 K09CL-D in Rock Island, Washington
 K09FF-D in Squilchuck St. Park, Washington
 K09QD-D in Huslia, Alaska
 K09QE-D in Larsen Bay, Alaska
 K09QL-D in Allakaket, Alaska
 K09RG-D in Kongiganak, Alaska
 K09RV-D in Arctic Village, Alaska
 K09SO-D in Chignik Lagoon, Alaska
 K09TM-D in Kakhonak, Alaska
 K09UB-D in Whittier, Alaska
 K09YQ-D in Ketchikan, Alaska
 K12AA-D in Troy, Montana
 K29JW-D in Granite Falls, Minnesota
 K31GK-D in Ukiah, California
 K34IV-D in Fruitland, Utah
 K36QI-D in Quartz Creek, etc., Montana
 K39DG-D in Trinity Center, California
 K42LH-D in Winston, Oregon
 KABY-TV in Aberdeen, South Dakota
 WLDW-LD in Myrtle Beach, South Carolina
 WLEP-LD in Erie, Pennsylvania

References

09 virtual